Dear Genevieve is a television show on the U.S. cable network HGTV, hosted by Genevieve Gorder.

The series debuted in January 2009, on HGTV.  The show focuses on how Gorder designs a room or an area for a family, after they have written to the show asking for help.

Episodes

Season 1

Season 2

Season 3

Season 4

See also
 HGTV Design Star

References

External links
Dear Genevieve  on HGTV
Dear Genevieve on IMDb

HGTV original programming
2009 American television series debuts
2012 American television series endings